The St. John United Methodist Church in Shelbyville, Kentucky was a historic church located on College Street. It was built in 1896 and added to the National Register in 1984.

It was deemed to be the "best local example of frame Gothic Revival religious architecture" and also an "important landmark in the evolution of black religious history in Shelbyville."

The congregation was originally affiliated with the Colored Methodist Episcopal Church. The land to build a church was acquired from David H. Wayne in 1887, but construction did not commence until 1894, being completed in 1896. Over the next century, many notable figures in the African American history of Shelby County were members here, including Zora Clark, the first African American in the county to receive a nursing degree; T.S. Baxter, the first African American elected to the Shelbyville city council; and Emma Payne Roland, the first African American reporter for the local newspaper, the Shelby Sentinel. After various conference mergers, it eventually became a congregation of the United Methodist Church, and in 1996, moved to a modern worship space at 212 Martin Luther King Junior Street nearby.

It was listed as part of a larger study of historic resources in Shelbyville.

The church building appears no longer to exist.

The church was one of the best local examples of Carpenter Gothic architecture, known for its tall steeple and 30 stained glass windows. At the time of its construction, it was the largest African American congregation in town, and served the largest congregation.

References

United Methodist churches in Kentucky
National Register of Historic Places in Shelby County, Kentucky
Gothic Revival church buildings in Kentucky
Churches completed in 1896
19th-century Methodist church buildings in the United States
Churches on the National Register of Historic Places in Kentucky
African-American history of Kentucky
Churches in Shelbyville, Kentucky
1896 establishments in Kentucky
Christian Methodist Episcopal churches in Kentucky
Demolished but still listed on the National Register of Historic Places